is a Japanese company manufacturing and selling outboard motors, pleasure boats, portable fire pumps, small fire trucks, pumps for construction and drainage, and refrigeration units for transportation. It also does real estate property management in Japan.

History
The company can be traced back to 1922, when the Takata Motor Research Institute began carrying out research into various forms of internal combustion engines. Research and development of high-speed, portable engine generators and radio-controlled generators began immediately; these were brought to production in 1930. During the 1930s and 40s, Tohatsu consolidated its product line and moved its corporate office to Tokyo. Among its products in the 1930s were railcars for the Ministry of Railways.

In 1950, production and sales of motorcycles began. 1955 brought aggressive growth to Tohatsu. Capital increased to 150 million yen and production on a new line of engines started. Sales offices were established in Fukuoka, Nagoya, Tokyo, Sendai and Sapporo. Dealerships were set up throughout Japan.

In the mid-1950s, the company held the top market share, with 22 percent of the Japanese motorbike market. They also manufactured racing motorcycles and achieved success in Japan and abroad. Financial problems led to the discontinuation of Tohatsu motorcycle production in 1964.

Tohatsu Outboards
1956 ushered in the production of the first Tohatsu Outboards (1.5 hp). Since then, Tohatsu outboards have served a variety of marketplaces: commercial fishing, military, marine transport, surf life saving, recreation and competition racing. They are the second largest producer of outboards in the world.

As well as marketing outboards under its own brand, Tohatsu outboards are rebadged and sold as other brands. In 1988 Tohatsu and Brunswick Corporation set up a joint venture named Tohatsu Marine Corporation to produce outboards for Mercury Marine. All Mercury outboards with less than 30 HP are rebranded Tohatsus.

In 2011, Tohatsu and Evinrude Outboard Motors made a deal to make smaller engines ranging from 15 HP and down with Evinrude decals.

All outboard engines sold in North America by the now-defunct Nissan Marine were rebadged Tohatsus.

References

External links 

Official global website 

Official Russian website

Engineering companies based in Tokyo
Marine engine manufacturers
Engine manufacturers of Japan
Manufacturing companies based in Tokyo
Manufacturing companies established in 1922
1922 establishments in Japan
Japanese brands
Pump manufacturers